Zacharovanyi Krai National Nature Park (meaning: "Enchanted Land") is one of the National Parks in Ukraine, located in Zakarpattia Oblast in the country's southwest. The park has its headquarters in the town of Irshava, Irshava Raion.

The national park contains a varied flora and fauna, including Carpathian red deer, chamois, brown bear, wild boar, European badger, Eurasian lynx, European wildcat, Eurasian beaver, trout and grayling. The park was created to preserve, reproduce and efficient use of the typical and unique natural complexes of Eastern Carpathians.

References

 Географічна енциклопедія України : у 3 т. / редколегія: О. М. Маринич (відпов. ред.) та ін. — К. : «Українська радянська енциклопедія» ім. М. П. Бажана, 1989.

External links
 
 Указ президента України Віктора Ющенка про створення Національного природного парку «Зачарований край»

Parks in Ukraine
National parks of Ukraine
Protected areas established in 2009
2009 establishments in Ukraine
Primeval Beech Forests in Europe